National Route 488 is a national highway of Japan connecting between Masuda, Shimane and Hatsukaichi, Hiroshima in Japan, with total length has 108.9 km (67.66 mi).

References

488
Roads in Shimane Prefecture
Roads in Hiroshima Prefecture